Qatruyeh District is a district (bakhsh) in Neyriz County, Fars Province, Iran. At the 2006 census, its population was 15,605, in 3,698 families.  The District has one city: Qatruyeh. The District has two rural districts (dehestan): Qatruyeh Rural District and Rizab Rural District.

References 

Neyriz County
Districts of Fars Province